Corofin is a parish in County Clare and part of the Roman Catholic Diocese of Killaloe. The parish is an amalgamation of the medieval parishes of Rath and Kilnaboy (or Killinaboy). At least since 1731 both parishes are administered by one priest.

 co-parish priests are Damien Nolan and Pat O'Neil.

The main church of the parish is the Church of St. Brigid in Corofin, completed in 1823. This is possibly the first Catholic church in County Clare designed by an architect.

The second church of the parish is the "Church of St. Joseph" in Kilnaboy. This church was built in 1967. It replaced a barn church built in 1846 (now a garage). Tradition wants that this barn church was a replacement of a mass house built in 1725.

Third church of the parish is St. Mary in the townland Roxton, part of the former parish of Rath. This church was built in 1869 and replaced an older church in the townland Liscullaun.

Parish of Rath
The ecclesiastical parish of Rath was rather peculiar, as it had never any settlement but was entirely rural. The correct name was Rathblathmaic as it derived it name from de rath of St. Blathmaic. It comprised the Túath of the Ui Flaithri, subtribe of the Dal gCais.

Gallery
Parish of Kilnaboy (renamed Corofin)

Former parish of Rath

References

Parishes of the Roman Catholic Diocese of Killaloe